Hiral Patel (born 10 August 1991) is an Indian-born international cricketer who plays for Canada. He is a left-handed batsman and slow left-arm orthodox bowler.

Career
Patel played his debut first-class match against Afghanistan on 20 February 2010. On his debut matches he scored 55 runs and bowl 13 over took just 1 wicket.

Patel made his ODI debut against Kenya on 19 August 2009. He also made his T20I debut against Ireland.

Patel was included in Canada's squad for the 2015 ICC World Twenty20 Qualifier tournament in July 2015, after Nikhil Dutta chose to stay with the St Kitts and Nevis Patriots in the Caribbean Premier League.

On 3 June 2018, he was selected to play for the Winnipeg Hawks in the players' draft for the inaugural edition of the Global T20 Canada tournament. In April 2019, he was named in Canada's squad for the 2019 ICC World Cricket League Division Two tournament in Namibia. In October 2021, he was named in Canada's Twenty20 International (T20I) squad for the 2021 ICC Men's T20 World Cup Americas Qualifier tournament in Antigua.

References

External links

1991 births
Living people
Canadian cricketers
Canada One Day International cricketers
Canada Twenty20 International cricketers
Cricketers at the 2011 Cricket World Cup
Cricketers from Ahmedabad
Indian cricketers
Indian emigrants to Canada